Cinco (Spanish for "Five") is an unincorporated community in Kern County, California.

It is located on the southwestern edge of Fremont Valley , east of and at the foot of the Sierra Nevada (U.S.) Mountains, south of Red Rock Canyon State Park (California). at an elevation of 2149 feet (655 m). It is southwest of Cantil, California and east of Cross Mountain.

Cinco was founded as a work camp in the early 20th century for workers on the Los Angeles Aqueduct (Owens Valley aqueduct).

References

Populated places in the Mojave Desert
Unincorporated communities in Kern County, California
Los Angeles Aqueduct
Unincorporated communities in California